Russian Gyroplanes is a Russian aircraft manufacturer based in Zhukovsky, Moscow Oblast. The company specializes in the design and manufacture of autogyros in the form of ready-to-fly aircraft, as well as and hovercraft. The company was founded in 2007.

The company has two autogyros in their product line, the single-seat Gyros-1 Farmer and the two-seat Gyros-2 Smartflier, both aimed at the aerial work market, with roles including aerial application, courier, forestry patrol, search and rescue, geological survey, air taxi and flight training.

Aircraft 
Summary of vehicles built by Russian Gyroplanes:

Autogyros
Russian Gyroplanes Gyros-1 Farmer
Russian Gyroplanes Gyros-2 Smartflier

Hovercraft
Russian Gyroplanes Gerris

References

External links

Aircraft manufacturers of Russia
Autogyros
Hovercraft
2007 establishments in Russia
Companies based in Moscow Oblast